Dharmakshetra is a mythological drama series which aired on the channel The EPIC Channel. The series is set in the aftermath of the battle of Mahabharata. The story is told from the perspective of the various characters as  they are brought to the court of Chitragupta. All the episodes are available on streaming network EPIC ON.

Synopsis 
After the end of 18 days war of Mahabharata, Pandavas and Kauravas reach the court of Chitragupta where they have to answer their actions of their past life. In each episode one of the character takes the centre stage to answer the questions asked by Chitragupta on behalf of the others.

Cast

Episodes

References

External links 
 
 Dharmakshetra on Netflix
 Dharmakshetra on EPIC ON

Epic TV original programming
2014 Indian television series debuts
2015 Indian television series endings
Television series based on Mahabharata